Stal Stalowa Wola Piłkarska Spółka Akcyjna,  commonly referred to as Stal Stalowa Wola, is a Polish professional football club based in Stalowa Wola, Subcarpathian Voivodeship. Founded in 1938, the club competes in the III liga, group IV, the fourth division of Polish football.

Stal's greatest success are 12th place in the 1993–94 Ekstraklasa, 1990–91 I liga championship and the quarter-final of the 1991–92 Polish Cup. It is the fourth best team in the history of the I liga, second professional association football division.

Since the spring round of the 2019–20 season, Stalowa Wola has played its home games at the 3,764-capacity Podkarpackie Centrum Piłki Nożnej. Previously the team had played at the Stadion MOSiR from the 1930s, when the stadium was built. The club has a long-standing rivalry with Siarka Tarnobrzeg, and matches between the two sides are known as the great derby of Subcarpathia.

The club's traditional colours are green and black, and the club is known as Stalówka and Hutnicy (Steelworkers). At the beginning of its existence, it was associated with the Huta Stalowa Wola. In May 2010, a joint-stock sport company was built up under the name "Stal Stalowa Wola Piłkarska Spółka Akcyjna". It is the lawful successor and continuator of the "ZKS Stal Stalowa Wola" tradition. In July 2018, the city of Stalowa Wola took over the club's majority stake.

History
In 1938, who was the director of Huta Stalowa Wola, established the Klub Sportowy Stalowa Wola (Sports Club Stalowa Wola). At that time, the club had a pitch without running tracks and stands. The players were amateurs. During this period, training sessions took place after finishing work, and the matches were played on Sunday. The first match took place on May 4, 1939, in the Saint Florian's Day who is the patron saint of steelworkers.

After the World War II, the club resumed its activity. In the 1953 season, Stal won the Klasa A (4th level). For the first time footballers from Stalowa Wola were promoted to II liga (2nd level) in 1973, under the leadership of Jerzy Kopa. Stal players played in the second league until 1987, when they won promotion to Ekstraklasa in the play-offs against Górnik Knurów.  Stal Stalowa Wola played in Ekstraklasa in the following seasons: 1987–88, 1991–92, 1993–94 and 1994–95. The greatest successes of Stal include participation in the quarter-finals of the Polish Cup (1991–92 edition).

In the wake of winning the 2001–02 II liga (fourth group), Stal was elevated to I liga. In the primary season in the subsequent level, it was fifteenth completing in the relegation zone. At this level, it showed up again in 2006.  It tumbled to the third level after the 2009–10 season, assuming the penultimate position in the league, ahead of Motor Lublin only. In the 2009–10 Polish Cup edition, Stal reached the 1/8 finals. In the second round, it unexpectedly eliminated the title defender Lech Poznań with Robert Lewandowski in the squad (0–0, p. 4–1). In 2010–2020, Stal played continuously in II liga. 

The 2019–20 II liga season began severely for the Subcarpathian team – they had one point in the initial five matches. After the loss to Błękitni Stargard (0–1), the coach Paweł Wtorek resigned. He was replaced by Szymon Szydełko, who was unable to turn around the club's fortunes. Stalówka finished the season in 15th, thus becoming relegated to III liga. Szydełko stayed at the club, beginning another season with a victory in the Polish Cup over the II liga side Skra Częstochowa (3–1 win). On October 31, 2020, after the 0–3 loss to Wisła Puławy, Szymon Szydełko was released from his contract (at the time of his release, Stal was sixth, 18 points behind to first place). On November 4, 2020, Jaromir Wieprzęć was announced as his successor. They were not able to win the promotion back the following season, finding themselves remaining in the fourth-tier III liga.

Naming history
 1938–1944 – Klub Sportowy Stalowa Wola (Sports Club Stalowa Wola)
 1944–1947 – Związkowy Klub Sportowy Stalowa Wola (Association Sports Club Stalowa Wola)
 1947–1949 – Związkowy Klub Sportowy Metal Stalowa Wola (Association Sports Club Metal Stalowa Wola)
 1949–1952 – Związkowy Klub Sportowy Stal Stalowa Wola (Association Sports Club Stalowa Wola)
 1952–1957 – Koło Sportowe Stalowa Wola (The Sports Network Stalowa Wola)
 1957–1958 – Międzyzakładowy Klub Sportowy Stal Stalowa Wola, in short MKS Stal Stalowa Wola
 1958–2010 – Zakładowy Klub Sportowy Stal Stalowa Wola, in short ZKS Stal Stalowa Wola
 2010–today – Stal Stalowa Wola Piłkarska Spółka Akcyjna (Stal Stalowa Wola Football Joint Stock Company), in short Stal Stalowa Wola P.S.A.

Stadium

Stal Stalowa Wola plays its home matches at the Podkarpackie Centrum Piłki Nożnej (Subcarpathian Football Center) at the Hutnicza 10a Street. It opened in 2020 and has been the home stadium of Stal Stalowa Wola since its completion. The stadium has lighting and a heated pitch. It holds 3,764 people (including 258 seats for visitors fans). In the first match at the new stadium, on February 29, 2020, Stal drew 0–0 with Bytovia Bytów (it was also the inauguration of artificial lighting).

Players

Current squad

Former players

Notable players
Players who have been capped, including national youth football teams.

  Waldemar Adamczyk
  Józef Dankowski
  Mohamed Essam
  Michał Janicki
  Danko Kovačević
  Préjuce Nakoulma
  Maciej Nalepa
   Rezső Patkoló (Rudolf Patkolo)
  Piotr Piechniak
  Dawid Pietrzkiewicz
  Kacper Śpiewak
  Sebastian Zalepa

Players who have played in the team of the Stal Stalowa Wola's stars against the Wisła Kraków's stars in 2017.

  Wojciech Niemiec
  Mirosław Mścisz
  Wiesław Pędlowski 
  Paweł Rybak
  Artur Kopeć
  Jerzy Zygarek
  Mieczysław Ożóg 
  Dariusz Michalak 
  Paweł Szafran
  Marek Kusiak
  Arkadiusz Bilski 
  Janusz Góreczny 
  Dariusz Bartnik 
  Piotr Piechniak 
  Marek Drozd
  Daniel Radawiec 
  Dariusz Brytan
  Antoni Fijarczyk

Personnel

Coaches over the years

Honours 
 I liga
 Winners: 1990–91
 Polish Cup
 Quarter-final: 1991–92

 Subcarpathian Stalowa Wola Polish Cup:
Winners: 2020–21
 Subcarpathian Polish Cup:
Runners-up: 2020–21

Records

All-time records
 Ekstraklasa: 54th (103 points reached)
 I liga: 4th (1316 points reached)
 II liga: 17th (above 661 points reached)

Ekstraklasa records
 Number of seasons: 4
 First game: 0–1 (H) v Zagłębie Lubin (August 9, 1987)
 Biggest win: 4–0 (A) v Igloopol Dębica (November 23, 1991)
 Biggest defeat: 0–6 (A) v Górnik Zabrze (August 27, 1994)
 Longest series of victories: 2 (three times)
 Longest series of defeats: 4 (two times)
 Highest attendance at the Stadion MOSiR: 12,000 v Legia Warsaw 1–0 (October 30, 1994)
(H) – Home ; (A) – Away

Polish Cup records
The following list is not complete.

Stal's places in Ekstraklasa

1987–1988

1991–1992

1993–1994

1994–1995

Supporters
Stal Stalowa Wola fans have a friendship with supporters of GKS Jastrzębie, Łada Biłgoraj, Polonia Przemyśl, Sokół Nisko and Stal Rzeszów. Stal's major rivals are Hutnik Kraków, Korona Kielce, KSZO Ostrowiec Świętokrzyski, Motor Lublin, Siarka Tarnobrzeg and Stal Mielec. The team's fan group is called "Stalówka The Firm". In 2020 officially begun a friendship with Ultras of Italian giants Inter Curva Nord Milano.

Derbies
The great character species have games between Stal and Siarka Tarnobrzeg (called the great derby of Subcarpathia), Motor Lublin (called the east derby) and KSZO Ostrowiec Świętokrzyski (called the metallurgical derby).

Between Stal and Siarka

Between Stal and Motor

Between Stal and KSZO

Team reserve

Stal Stalowa Wola II is a Polish football team, which serves as the reserve side of Stal Stalowa Wola. They compete in the IV liga Subcarpathia, the fifth division of Polish football, and play their home matches at training pitch of the Podkarpackie Centrum Piłki Nożnej.

The players of the reserves in the 2020–21 season are: Jakub Lebioda, Tymoteusz Buczek, Filip Moskal, Kryspin Białas, Igor Fedejko, Szczepan Knap, Bartosz Tłuczek, Adrian Czyż, Maciej Wojtak, Szymon Grabarz, Maciej Krajanowski, Tomasz Węglarz, Williams Omuru, Konrad Maślach, Maksymilian Popek, Kacper Moskal, Rafał Świerad, Gabriel Środa, Bartosz Gnatek, Wojciech Bosak, Sebastian Gnatek and Mikołaj Burdzy. The team's coach is Sławomir Adamus.

Notes

References

External links
 Official website
 Official Facebook side
 Stal Stalowa Wola Results

 
Association football clubs established in 1938
1938 establishments in Poland
Football clubs in Podkarpackie Voivodeship